Kendwa is a village on the Tanzanian island of Unguja, part of Zanzibar. It is located in the far north of the island, on the west coast overlooking the nearby small Daloni Island and the larger and more distant Tumbatu Island.

References

Finke, J. (2006) The Rough Guide to Zanzibar (2nd edition). New York: Rough Guides.

Villages in Zanzibar